Deniz Undav (born 19 July 1996) is a German professional footballer who plays as a forward for Premier League club Brighton & Hove Albion.

Career
In April 2020, it was announced Undav would leave 3. Liga club SV Meppen at the end of the 2019–20 season. With his Meppen contract running out, he would join Belgian First Division B side Union Saint-Gilloise on a three-year deal.

On 13 March 2021, Undav won the championship with Union Saint-Gilloise in the Belgian First Division B ending his season on 17 goals in 26 games.

On the 15th matchday in the 2021–22 Belgian First Division A season Undav scored, for the first time in his career, a quadruple away at K.V. Oostende in the 7–1 victory.

Brighton & Hove Albion
On 31 January 2022, Undav joined Premier League club Brighton & Hove Albion for 6 millions euros, signing a four-and-a-half year deal. He immediately returned to Union Saint-Gilloise until the end of the 2021–22 season.

Undav made his Albion debut on the opening game of the 2022–23 season, coming on as a 90+5th minute substitute for Danny Welbeck, helping Brighton seal their first ever victory at Old Trafford after beating Manchester United 2–1. He scored his first goal for the club in his second appearance, opening the scoreline in the 3–0 away victory over League One side Forest Green Rovers in the second round of the EFL Cup on 24 August. He didn't score again until over four-and-a-half months later on 7 January 2023, scoring Brighton's last after coming on as a substitute, in the 5–1 away thrashing over Championship side Middlesbrough in the FA Cup third round. Undav made his first Premier League start on 4 February, creating chances and making several attempts on goal without success before being substituted off in the eventual 1–0 home win over Bournemouth. He opened the scoreline on 19 March, scoring a rebound from a Moisés Caicedo shot, later assisting a Evan Ferguson goal in the 5–0 FA Cup quarter-final win over League Two side Grimsby Town.

Personal life
Born in Germany, Undav has Kurdish roots. His family is from the city of Urfa and the town Viranşehir in Turkey.

Career statistics

Honours
Union SG
Belgian First Division B: 2020–21

Individual
 Belgian First Division A top scorer: 2021–22
 Belgian Professional Footballer of the Year: 2021–22

References

External links
 

1996 births
Living people
People from Verden (district)
Footballers from Lower Saxony
German footballers
Association football forwards
TSV Havelse players
Eintracht Braunschweig II players
SV Meppen players
Royale Union Saint-Gilloise players
Brighton & Hove Albion F.C. players
3. Liga players
Regionalliga players
Belgian Pro League players
Challenger Pro League players
Premier League players
German expatriate footballers
Expatriate footballers in Belgium
Expatriate footballers in England
German expatriate sportspeople in Belgium
German expatriate sportspeople in England
German people of Turkish descent